F. William Conner is an American business executive.

Education and personal life
Conner was born and reared in West Helena, Arkansas. In his early years, he displayed "an interest in energy conversion". In 1981, he received his bachelor's degree from Princeton University in mechanical engineering and later earned an MBA from the Wharton School of the University of Pennsylvania in 1987. Currently, he lives in Dallas, Texas with his wife.

Career
With a career spanning more than 30 years across high-tech industries, Conner is a corporate turnaround expert and a global leader in cybersecurity, data and infrastructure. From 1981 to 1992, he held positions at AT&T including senior engineer, operations manager and strategic planner.

Conner held executive positions at Nortel Networks from 1992 to 2001. As the president of Enterprise Data Networks for Nortel, he managed its US$9.1 billion acquisition of Bay Networks. He also served as the first chief marketing officer of Nortel, launching the global marketing campaigns "Come Together" and "What Do You Want the Internet to Be?"

Entrust
From 2001 to 2013, Conner was the chief executive officer and president of Entrust, a private software company that specializes in identity-based security. He was responsible for the creation and delivery of identity-based security software and services. Entrust grew to profitability (albeit short due to its early focus on growth) and reached annual sales of well over $100 million by the time of arrival of Conner to the firm in 2001. He shortly thereafter launched a restructuring effort and began to trim workforce annually in an effort to return the company to profitability. He launched a new business model focusing on product portfolios targeted to key verticals and geographies.

Spun out of Nortel in 1997, Entrust was a pioneer in public key infrastructure (PKI) technology by providing the first scalable, robust product to offer public key infrastructure for authentication and encryption for web transactions.

In April 2002, Entrust's PKI technology served as the foundation for the prototype of what is now the United States Federal Bridge Certification Authority (FBCA), which is a fundamental element of the trust infrastructure that provides the basis for intergovernmental and cross-governmental secure communications. Entrust's PKI is interoperable with all major FBCA vendors.

The Entrust Managed PKI service was the first of its kind to deliver certificates utilized by the U.S. Federal Personal Identity Verification (PIV) smartcard, providing authentication, encryption and digital signature to protect U.S. Federal assets from unauthorized access. Under Conner's leadership, Entrust also played a key role in the introduction of ePassports, including for the United States, where certificates are utilized to protect the privacy of the biometrics while authenticating the citizen.

Conner engineered the company's acquisition by private equity firm Thoma Bravo in 2009, and transitioned Entrust into a private firm. In December 2013, it was announced that Datacard Group had entered into an agreement to purchase Entrust for a reported $500 million. Conner took on a consultant role during the transition.

Silent Circle
On January 5, 2015, Silent Circle announced that its board of directors had appointed Conner as Chief Executive Officer and member of the board of directors. As CEO of Silent Circle, he also joined the board of directors of Blackphone. On June 17, 2016, Silent Circle blogged that Conner had resigned as CEO and would remain only as an "advisor," implying he had also resigned his seat on the board.

SonicWall
Formerly a division of Dell Software Inc., SonicWall was spun off and acquired by Francisco Partners and Elliott Management in June 2016. On November 1, 2016, SonicWall announced that it had commenced standalone operations, and named Conner its President and CEO.

SonicWall states it is the North American market share leader in internet security appliances among small and medium-sized enterprises. In August 2016, SonicWall launched its Capture Advanced Threat Prevention Service, and has analyzed more than 4 million suspicious files for its clients as of November 1, 2016. The cloud-based service uses multiple engines to help prevent attacks, and automates remediation techniques.

Conner stated publicly that SonicWall will continue its relationship with Dell, as a reseller partner, and will continue its service areas focused on network security, secure mobile access, email security and encryption, and management and reporting.

In September 2018, at a SonicWall Channel Partner conference, Conner outlined the rapid growth in non-standard port threats, and explained a business reorganization to serve both the SME and enterprise business markets focusing on the enterprise verticals of retail, education and government.

To help organizations pivot to remain operational during the COVID-19 pandemic, in April 2020 Conner introduced SonicWall's Boundless Cybersecurity model designed to secure organizations that are increasingly remote, mobile, and less secure, and empower organizations and businesses to close the growing cybersecurity business and skills gaps.

On July 21, 2022, SonicWall announced that Conner would be taking a new role as executive chairman of the board. Bob VanKirk, the former chief revenue officer, was announced as the new president and CEO of the company.

Comodo CA (now Sectigo) 
In October 2017, Francisco Partners acquired Comodo Certification Authority (Comodo CA) and named Conner chairman of the board. This marked a transition in ownership from the Comodo organization as Comodo CA, an industry leader in SSL security with more than 200,000 customers across 150 countries, focuses on the significant market opportunity associated with SSL certificates and the massive growth in online and IoT traffic. In November 2018, Comodo CA rebranded itself as Sectigo, to avoid confusion with its former parent entity Comodo Group.

As a provider of SSL and other types of digital certificates, Sectico is also heavily invested in PKI. With the new name came a large investment in X.509 certificate management, including the discovery and reporting of certificates issued via PKI but also the automated installation of certificates, which helps saves labor cost while eliminating mistakes made by mis-configured and expired certificates. In 2019, Sectigo was the first commercial CA to delivered automated installation of both Public and Private SSL certificates into web servers and load balancers on both sides of the firewall using ACME (RFC8555), in collaboration with the Electronic Frontier Foundation (EFF). Sectigo also released industry-first PKI DevOps integrations for management and container orchestration platforms, including Docker, Kubernetes, Ansible and Terraform.

In 2020, GI Partners announced a definitive agreement to acquire Sectigo, with the intention of supporting the acceleration of Sectigo’s security innovations and growth and fostering worldwide expansion.

Cybersecurity and infrastructure global trends

Conner has been active in various public-private partnerships on cybersecurity, cybertheft and infrastructure security. He helped unveil the INTERPOL Global Smart eID Card and addressed the United Nations on global challenges in cybercrime in June 2010. He co-chaired the Corporate Governance Task Force of the U.S. Department of Homeland Security National Cybersecurity Partnership. He has been a member of the Business Software Alliance and the Cyber Security Industry Alliance (now a branch of TechAmerica technology trade association). He created and co-chaired the Information Security Governance Task Force of the Business Software Alliance. He is a member of the Enterprise Software Roundtable.

In a September 2018 article on cybersecurity trends, Conner describes innovative next-generation security techniques in the cloud and the deep web. The article references RTDMI (Real-Time Deep Memory Inspection), a new patent-pending technology created by SonicWall.

In February 2018, former Secretary of the Department of Homeland Security Michael Chertoff and Bill Conner collaborated on an opinion article written for The Hill. In it, they detail some of the recent actions taken by the U.S. Congress and the SEC regarding cyber accountability and transparency.

In 2017, Conner became a Forbes Community Voice Contributor, as a member of the Forbes Technology Council. His articles have featured topics such as cybersecurity and policy trends, cyber threat intelligence, and how human predictability factors into cyberattacks. He has also written articles and contributed to reports on email-borne cyberattacks and ransomware.

In February 2012, Conner took part in a United States House of Representatives committee on Energy and Commerce hearing to discuss cybersecurity threats facing the US and the role of public-private partnerships play in defense. Conner has recently spent time discussing the effects of spear phishing schemes on weak authentication, notably the rash of attacks on media outlets, and the risks of insider threats.

Recent publications
 "Cyber Defense: Bill Conner of SonicWall On The 5 Things Every American Business Leader Should Do To Shield Themselves From A Cyberattack," Authority Magazine, July 12, 2022
 "Webinar (Italy): 2021 Cyber Threat Landscape Roundtable," Fondazione CRUI, March 26, 2021.
“Cybersecurity for the post-COVID new normal of work,” Harvard Business School – Managing the Future of Work (audio podcast), August 25, 2020
 “Veiled Threats: The Growing Cyberattack Vectors Few People Talk About,” "Forbes," Bill Conner (author), Dec. 6, 2019
 “Back-To-School Lists Should Now Include Ransomware,” "Forbes," Bill Conner (author), Sept. 24, 2019
 “Bill Conner: You Cannot Have Privacy Without Security,” Cyber Security Interviews (audio podcast), Sept. 16, 2019
 “The CyberWire Daily Podcast: Episode 926,” The Cyberwire Daily Podcast (audio podcast), Sept. 12, 2019
 "Side-Channel Attacks: Cyber Warfare’s New Battleground,” “Security Boulevard,” Bill Conner (author), Aug. 22, 2019
 "The Independent Show,” Keynote Speaker, ACA Connects Event, July 31, 2019
 "AI, Threat Intelligence and The Cyber Arms Race: SonicWall CEO Bill Conner Joins The Chertoff Group Security Series," "The Chertoff Group" (video of panel discussion), June 19, 2019
 "In focus: SonicWall CEO Bill Conner," SC Magazine, May 7, 2019
 "Dramatic rise in fraudulent PDF files in 2019: SonicWall study," "CISCO Mag," Apr. 22, 2019
 “Old-school cruel: Dodgy PDF email attachments enjoying a renaissance,” “The Register,” John Oates (author), Apr. 19, 2019
 “Report: Weaponized PDFs on the Rise,” “Nextgov,” Brandi Vincent (author), Apr. 19, 2019
 “Insights & Intelligence Podcast: Inside the Tactical Advances between Cybercriminals and Security Industry,” “The Chertoff Group” (audio podcast), Apr. 15, 2019
 “SonicWall report paints sobering picture of cyberthreat trends,” “SiliconAngle,” Paul Gillin (author), Mar, 26, 2019
 "Slate Of New Product Offerings Marks Rebirth Of SonicWall," "Forbes," Tony Bradley (author), Feb. 27, 2019
 "Who’s taking malware seriously? SonicWall’s CEO has the answers," "Information Age," Nick Ismael (author), Feb. 7, 2019
 "SMBs Need Layered Security to Defend Their Businesses," "Forbes," Bill Conner (author), Feb. 4, 2019
 "CEO Outlook: 5 Questions on 2019," "CRN," Bill Conner (author), January 2019
 "New Law Aids SMBs in Combating Cybersecurity Risks," "ChannelPro Network," Martin Sinderman (author), Dec. 6, 2018
 "CEO Spotlight: Bill Conner, CEO, SonicWall," "KRLD Radio," Bill Conner (author), Nov. 30, 2018
 “Opinion: Two cybersecurity policies, one clear new objective,” The Hill, Bill Conner (author), Nov. 20, 2018
 “Congress Passes Bill Creating Cybersecurity Agency at DHS,” Security Week, Eduard Kovacs (author), Nov. 15, 2018
 “13 Tech Experts Share What Facebook Should Do Post-Data Breach,” Forbes, Bill Connor (co-author), Nov. 13, 2018
 “Privacy Problems for FANG Companies Might Beget M&A Action in Cybersecurity,” The Street, Kevin Curran (author), Oct. 25, 2018
 “Facebook hack: How attackers stole the personal data of almost 30 million users,” ITPro (UK), Keumars Afifi-Sabet (author), Oct. 22, 2018
 “Chart of the Day: Google Plus Never Got Off the Ground,” Real Money, Kevin Curran (author), Oct. 9, 2018
 “Hackers compromise Facebook users’ security,” The Signal (US), James Wright (author), Oct. 8, 2018
 “A leader has to be passionate,” Authority Magazine, Oct. 7, 2018
 “ ‘Unprecedented’ Russian cyberattacks announcement is just the start – and businesses should be prepared,” Verdict, Lucy Ingham (author), Oct. 4, 2018
 “UK and allies accuse Russia of cyber attack campaign,” Computer Weekly, Warwick Ashford (author), Oct. 4, 2018
 “The UK, US and Netherlands accuse Russia of cyber attacks,” ITPro (UK), Bobby Hellard (author), Oct. 5, 2018
 “Betabot infostealer infections spreading in the wild, researchers say,” SC Magazine, Rene Millman (author), Oct. 3, 2018
 “Facebook Hack: People's Accounts Appear for Sale On Dark Web,” The Independent, Anthony Cuthbertson (author), Oct. 2, 2018
 “Facebook Hack May Result in GDPR Penalty,” Silicon (UK), Tom Jowitt (author), Oct. 2, 2018
"Bill Conner: A Vanguard of Transformation Technology Shifts," Insights Success, The 10 Most Admired CEOs to Watch, August, 2018
"Protecting SMBs: The Key to Shrinking Nation’s Cyberattack Surface," Money, Inc., Bill Conner (author), Sept. 19 2018 In this article, Conner describes the impact of the new National Institute of Standards and Technology (NIST) Small Business Cybersecurity Act.
"Social Media Security: A Costly, but Worthy Cause for Shareholders," Real Money, Kevin Curran (author), Sept. 20, 2018
"How machine learning allowed one company to detect Meltdown and Spectre before Intel went public," TechRepublic, Jason Hiner (author), Apr. 20, 2018
 "The Value of Enterprise Privacy," The Guardian, Jul. 23, 2015
 "Viewpoint: U.K. Breach a Precautionary Tale for U.S.," American Banker, December 2007
 "Cybersecurity: Business Has to Enlist in This War" (co-author), guest opinion column, New York Times, Nov. 17, 2003
 "Vulnerability on the Cyber Front," co-author with Ret. Gen. Wesley Clark, Washington Times, Aug. 19, 2002

Awards
 2022 SC Awards Finalist: Security Executive of the Year
 The Top 25 IT Innovators of 2021, CRN, August 2, 2021 
SonicWall Attains 5-Star Rating in 2021 CRN Partner Program Guide, CRN, March 30, 2021
2021 Cybersecurity Global Excellence Awards: Grand Trophy, The Globee Awards, March 3, 2021 
Top 25 Enterprise IT Innovators of 2019, CRN 
 11 Coolest Endpoint Security CEOs of 2019, Solutions Review, July, 2019
 10 Most Admired CEOs to Watch, Insights Success, August, 2018
 Bill Conner, President and CEO of SonicWall, Chairman of the Board of Directors of Comodo CA, named by Info Security Product Guide as 2018 CEO of the Year (500-2,499 Employees): Gold Winner.
 CEO World Awards 2018 – CEO of the Year (500-2,499 Employees): Silver Winner. Bill Conner honored for driving SonicWall to surpass financial objectives for six consecutive quarters since becoming independent from Dell. 
 Listed by CRN as One of the Most Influential Executives of 2018 (cited as #21)
2017 SC Media 2017 Reboot Leadership Award to Bill Conner
One of the 25 Most Influential Executives Of 2017 according to CRN
 CRN Names Bill Conner 2017 Top Midmarket Vendor Executive
 2015 Global New Product Innovation Award to Silent Circle: Frost & Sullivan 2015: Global award given by Frost & Sullivan based on customer impact and new product attributes.
 Top 10 Most Innovative Companies of 2015 Fast Company: Silent Circle: Consumer Electronics focused review of Global companies leading in technology and security.
 Best of Mobile World Congress 2015: PCMag.com 2015: For Silent Circle BlackPhone 2: Top smartphone or tablet recognition from national magazine on technology products.
 2014 ICON Technology of the Year Award: for BlackPhone, Silent Circle and Geeksphone: ICON Magazine
 U.S. Federal 100 Award: Federal Computer Week March 2004: National award from Federal Computer Week recognizing the top 100 individuals and organizations for impact on U.S. Government technology and services.
 Tech Titans Corporate CEO of the Year: Metroplex Technology Business Council September 2003: Given by Metroplex Technology Business Council, recognizing technology leadership and raising scholarship funds for technology students.

References

Living people
American technology chief executives
Businesspeople in software
Wharton School of the University of Pennsylvania alumni
Princeton University School of Engineering and Applied Science alumni
Businesspeople from Dallas
People from West Helena, Arkansas
Nortel employees
American mechanical engineers
AT&T people
Chief marketing officers
Year of birth missing (living people)
Place of birth missing (living people)